The women's 'Soft Styles' category involved nine contestants from six countries across two continents - Europe and North America.  Each contestant went through seven performances (2 minutes each) with the totals added up at the end of the event.  The gold medal winner was Veronika Dombrovskaya from Belarus, while Russian's Elena Chirkova and Inna Berestova claimed silver and bronze.

Results

See also
List of WAKO Amateur World Championships
List of WAKO Amateur European Championships
List of female kickboxers

References

External links
 WAKO World Association of Kickboxing Organizations Official Site

Kickboxing events at the WAKO World Championships 2007 Coimbra
2007 in kickboxing
Kickboxing in Portugal